1898–99 was the second year of basketball at Michigan State Normal School. Both games were played at home against Albion College in Ypsilanti,Michigan. Michigan State Normal School ended up splitting the games and finished 1–1. The team captain was H.W. Conklin.

Schedule
Neither EMU or Albion have a date for games or a score for the first game. 

|-
!colspan=9 style="background:#006633; color:#FFFFFF;"| Non–conference regular season

References

Eastern Michigan Eagles men's basketball seasons
Michigan State Normal